Matt Osterman (born May 27, 1978, in Rhinelander, Wisconsin) is an American independent filmmaker. He wrote and directed the films Ghost from the Machine, 400 Days, and Hover.  He  resides in Roseville, Minnesota.

Biography 
Osterman started his career Directing and Producing short films, and working on the documentary Sportsfan with Aaron Lubarsky and Jon Stewart. Sportsfan aired nationally on SpikeTV and played numerous festivals all over the country. 

After the documentary, he went on to write and direct Ghost From The Machine, a low-budget feature film shot in Minneapolis. Ghost From the Machine premiered at the Fantasia Film Festival and had an amazing run on Netflix. It ended up being one of ten films in the nation to be accepted into the Independent Feature Project Filmmakers Narrative Lab in 2009. In 2011, Matt Osterman sold the remake rights of Ghost From the Machine to Universal. A few years later, Our House was produced by XYZ Films and Davis Entertainment. It was released by IFC Midnight and Elevation Pictures in 2018.

The film premiered January 12, 2016.

His most recent directorial work, Hover (2018), stars Cleopatra Coleman (also written by), Shane Coffey, Beth Grant, and muMs da Schemer. Currently, he is working on a new feature film, Bitcon, and it is set to air in the fall of 2022.

Osterman has also collaborated closely with Emmy Award winner and Guinness World Record Holder, Dan Buettner, helping him found the Quest Network and establish the Blue Zones.  He was also research lead on National Geographic Magazine’s, "Secrets of Longevity" which was the cover story of the 2005 November edition. In addition, Osterman has worked extensively in the creative/branding industries, helping create over 25 brands that can be seen in Target, Best Buy, Circuit City and Dick’s Sporting Goods.

Filmography 
 Sportsfan (2006) – Associate Producer
 Ghost from the Machine (2011) – Director, writer
 400 Days (2016) – Director, writer
 Hover   (2018) – Director

References

External links 
 
 

Living people
American film directors
American film producers
American male screenwriters
1978 births